Paolo Tagliavento (born 19 September 1972) is a former Italian association football referee officiated in the Serie A and UEFA competitions; namely the UEFA Champions League and UEFA Europa League.

Career

Club
Tagliavento began refereeing in the Serie A in 2004, officiating over 200 matches over the next fourteen years. In the Serie B he notched up over 80 games, whilst he also officiated Coppa Italia matches, as well as a relegation match in 2009.

On 8 December 2010, Tagliavento debuted as a referee in the UEFA Champions League, in a match between Arsenal and Partizan. He would go on to officiate over 20 additional Champions League games.

Tagliavento retired from refereeing on 30 May 2018. 

On 3 July 2018, Tagliavento was named club manager of Ternana.

International
Tagliavento officiated international friendlies, U-21 European qualifiers, as well as FIFA World Cup qualification matches in Europe. He was also a referee at the 2011 UEFA European Under-21 Championship.

International matches officiated

See also
 List of FIFA international referees

References

External links
 AusFootball.net Profile
 World Referee profile

1972 births
Living people
Italian football referees
UEFA Champions League referees
People from Terni
Sportspeople from the Province of Terni